The First Barbary War (1801–1805), also known as the Tripolitan War and the Barbary Coast War, was a conflict during the Barbary Wars, in which the United States and Sweden fought against Tripolitania. Tripolitania had declared war against Sweden and the United States over disputes regarding tributary payments made by both states in exchange for a cessation of Tripolitatian commerce raiding at sea. United States President Thomas Jefferson refused to pay this tribute. Sweden had been at war with the Tripolitans since 1800.

Background and overview

Barbary corsairs and crews from the quasi-independent North African Ottoman provinces of Algiers, Tunis, Tripoli, and the independent Sultanate of Morocco under the Alaouite dynasty (the Barbary Coast) were the scourge of the Mediterranean. Capturing merchant ships and enslaving or ransoming their crews provided the rulers of these nations with wealth and naval power. The Trinitarian Order, or order of "Mathurins", had operated from France for centuries with the special mission of collecting and disbursing funds for the relief and ransom of prisoners of Mediterranean pirates. According to Robert Davis, between 1 and 1.25 million Europeans were captured by Barbary pirates and sold as slaves between the 16th and 19th centuries.

Barbary corsairs led attacks upon American merchant shipping in an attempt to extort ransom for the lives of captured sailors, and ultimately tribute from the United States to avoid further attacks, as they had with the various European states. Before the Treaty of Paris, which formalized the United States' independence from Great Britain, United States shipping was protected by France during the revolutionary years under the Treaty of Alliance (1778–83). Although the treaty does not mention the Barbary States in name, it refers to common enemies between both the United States and France. As such, piracy against United States shipping only began to occur after the end of the American Revolution, when the United States government lost its protection under the Treaty of Alliance.

This lapse of protection by a European power led to the first American merchant ship being seized after the Treaty of Paris.  On 11 October 1784, Moroccan pirates seized the brigantine Betsey. The Spanish government negotiated the freedom of the captured ship and crew; however, Spain advised the United States to offer tribute to prevent further attacks against merchant ships. The United States Minister to France, Thomas Jefferson, decided to send envoys to Morocco and Algeria to try to purchase treaties and the freedom of the captured sailors held by Algeria. Morocco was the first Barbary Coast State to sign a treaty with the United States, on 23 June 1786. This treaty formally ended all Moroccan piracy against American shipping interests. Specifically, article six of the treaty states that if any Americans captured by Moroccans or other Barbary Coast States docked at a Moroccan city, they would be set free and come under the protection of the Moroccan State.

American diplomatic action with Algeria, the other major Barbary Coast State, was much less productive than with Morocco. Algeria began piracy against the United States on 25 July 1785 with the capture of the schooner Maria, and Dauphin a week later. All four Barbary Coast states demanded $660,000 each. However, the envoys were given only an allocated budget of $40,000 to achieve peace. Diplomatic talks to reach a reasonable sum for tribute or for the ransom of the captured sailors struggled to make any headway. The crews of Maria and Dauphin remained enslaved for over a decade, and soon were joined by crews of other ships captured by the Barbary States.

In March 1786, Thomas Jefferson and John Adams went to London to negotiate with Tripoli's envoy, ambassador Sidi Haji Abdrahaman (or Sidi Haji Abdul Rahman Adja). When they enquired "concerning the ground of the pretensions to make war upon nations who had done them no injury", the ambassador replied:

It was written in their Koran, that all nations which had not acknowledged the Prophet were sinners, whom it was the right and duty of the faithful to plunder and enslave; and that every mussulman who was slain in this warfare was sure to go to paradise. He said, also, that the man who was the first to board a vessel had one slave over and above his share, and that when they sprang to the deck of an enemy's ship, every sailor held a dagger in each hand and a third in his mouth; which usually struck such terror into the foe that they cried out for quarter at once. 

Jefferson reported the conversation to Secretary of Foreign Affairs John Jay, who submitted the ambassador's comments and offer to Congress. Jefferson argued that paying tribute would encourage more attacks. Although John Adams agreed with Jefferson, he believed that circumstances forced the United States to pay tribute until an adequate navy could be built. The United States had just fought an exhausting war, which put the nation deep in debt.

Various letters and testimonies by captured sailors describe their captivity as a form of slavery, even though Barbary Coast imprisonment was different from that practiced by the United States and the European powers of the time. Barbary Coast prisoners were able to obtain wealth and property, along with achieving status beyond that of a slave. One such example was James Leander Cathcart, who rose to the highest position a Christian slave could achieve in Algeria, becoming an adviser to the dey (governor). Even so, most captives were pressed into hard labor in the service of the Barbary pirates, and struggled under extremely poor conditions that exposed them to vermin and disease. As word of their treatment reached the United States, through freed captives' narratives and letters, Americans pushed for direct government action to stop the piracy against American ships.

On July 19, 1794, Congress appropriated $800,000 for the release of American prisoners and for a peace treaty with Algiers, Tunis, and Tripoli. On September 5, 1795, American negotiator Joseph Donaldson signed a peace treaty with the Dey of Algiers, that included an upfront payment of $642,500 in specie (silver coinage) for peace, the release of American captives, expenses, and various gifts for the Dey's royal court and family. An additional indefinite yearly tribute of $21,600 in shipbuilding supplies and ammunition would be given to the Dey.  The treaty, designed to prevent further piracy, resulted in the release of 115 American sailors held captive by the Dey.

Jefferson continued to argue for cessation of the tribute, with rising support from George Washington and others. With the recommissioning of the American Navy in 1794 and the resulting increased firepower on the seas, it became increasingly possible for America to refuse paying tribute, although by now the long-standing habit was difficult to change. The continuing demand for tribute ultimately led to the formation of the United States Department of the Navy, founded in 1798 to prevent further attacks upon American shipping and to end the demands for extremely large tributes from the Barbary States. Federalist and Anti-Federalist forces argued over the needs of the country and the burden of taxation. Jefferson's own Democratic-Republicans and anti-navalists believed that the future of the country lay in westward expansion, with Atlantic trade threatening to siphon money and energy away from the new nation, to be spent on wars in the Old World. During the divisive 1800 presidential election, Thomas Jefferson defeated incumbent President John Adams. Jefferson was sworn into office on March 4, 1801. The third President believed military force, rather than endless tributes, would be needed to resolve the Tripoli crisis.

Declaration of war and naval blockade
Just before Jefferson's inauguration in 1801, Congress passed naval legislation that, among other things, provided for six frigates that "shall be officered and manned as the President of the United States may direct." In the event of a declaration of war on the United States by the Barbary powers, these ships were to "protect our commerce and chastise their insolence—by sinking, burning or destroying their ships and vessels wherever you shall find them." On Jefferson's inauguration as president in 1801, Yusuf Karamanli, the Pasha (or Bashaw) of Tripoli, demanded $225,000 (equivalent to $ million in ) from the new administration. It was a long-standing tradition that, if a government was changed or the consular was changed, said government would have to pay 'consular' gifts, in either gold or in goods, usually military and naval stores. (In 1800, federal revenues totaled a little over $10 million.) Putting his long-held beliefs into practice, Jefferson refused the demand. Consequently, because of this, along with the Americans not paying the money nor the gifts as stated in the treaty signed in 1796 between Tripoli and America, on 10 May 1801, the Pasha declared war on the United States, not through any formal written documents but in the customary Barbary manner of cutting down the flagstaff in front of the United States Consulate. Algiers and Tunis did not follow their ally in Tripoli.

Before learning that Tripoli had declared war on the United States, Jefferson sent a small squadron, consisting of three frigates and one schooner, under the command of Commodore Richard Dale with gifts and letters to attempt to maintain peace with the Barbary powers. However, if war had been declared, then Dale was instructed to "protect American ships and citizens against potential aggression," but Jefferson insisted that he was "unauthorized by the constitution, without the sanction of Congress, to go beyond the line of defense." He told Congress: "I communicate [to you] all material information on this subject, that in the exercise of this important function confided by the constitution to the legislature exclusively their judgment may form itself on a knowledge and consideration of every circumstance of weight." Although Congress never voted on a formal declaration of war, it authorized the President to instruct the commanders of armed American vessels to seize all vessels and goods of the Pasha of Tripoli "and also to cause to be done all such other acts of precaution or hostility as the state of war will justify." The American squadron joined a Swedish flotilla under Rudolf Cederström in blockading Tripoli, as the Swedes having been at war with the Tripolitans since 1800.

On 31 May 1801, Commodore Edward Preble traveled to Messina, Sicily, to the court of King Ferdinand IV of the Kingdom of Naples. The kingdom was at war with Napoleon, but Ferdinand supplied the Americans with manpower, craftsmen, supplies, gunboats, mortar boats, and the ports of Messina, Syracuse, and Palermo to be used as naval bases for launching operations against Tripoli, a port walled fortress city protected by 150 pieces of heavy artillery and manned by 25,000 soldiers, assisted by a fleet of 10 ten-gunned brigs, 2 eight-gun schooners, two large galleys, and 19 gunboats. The schooner  (commanded by Lieutenant Andrew Sterret) defeated the 14-gun Tripolitan corsair Tripoli after a one-sided battle on 1 August 1801.

In 1802, in response to Jefferson's request for authority to deal with the pirates, Congress passed "An act for the protection of commerce and seamen of the United States against the Tripolitan cruisers", authorizing the President to "employ such of the armed vessels of the United States as may be judged requisite... for protecting effectually the commerce and seamen thereof on the Atlantic Ocean, the Mediterranean and adjoining seas." The statute authorized American ships to seize vessels belonging to the Bey of Tripoli, with the captured property distributed to those who brought the vessels into port.

The United States Navy went unchallenged on the sea, but still, the question remained undecided. Jefferson pressed the issue the following year, with an increase in military force and deployment of many of the navy's best ships to the region throughout 1802. Throughout 1803, Preble set up and maintained a blockade of the Barbary ports and executed a campaign of raids and attacks against the cities' fleets.

Battles

In October 1803, Tripoli's fleet captured USS Philadelphia intact after the frigate ran aground on a reef while patrolling Tripoli harbor. Efforts by the Americans to float the ship while under fire from shore batteries and Tripolitan Naval units failed. The ship, her captain, William Bainbridge, and all officers and crew were taken ashore and held as hostages. Philadelphia was turned against the Americans and anchored in the harbor as a gun battery.

On the night of 16 February 1804, Captain Stephen Decatur led a small detachment of United States Marines aboard the captured Tripolitan ketch rechristened USS Intrepid, thus deceiving the guards on Philadelphia to float close enough to board her. Decatur's men stormed the ship and overpowered the Tripolitan sailors. With fire support from the American warships, the Marines set fire to Philadelphia, denying her use by the enemy.

Preble attacked Tripoli on 14 July 1804, in a series of inconclusive battles, including an unsuccessful attack attempting to use Intrepid under Captain Richard Somers as a fire ship, packed with explosives and sent to enter Tripoli harbor, where she would destroy herself and the enemy fleet. However, Intrepid was destroyed, possibly by enemy gunfire, before she achieved her goal, killing Somers and his entire crew.

The turning point in the war was the Battle of Derna (April–May 1805). Ex-consul William Eaton, a former Army captain who used the title of "general", and United States Marine Corps 1st Lieutenant Presley O'Bannon led a force of eight U.S. Marines  and five hundred mercenaries—Greeks from Crete, Arabs, and Berbers—on a march across the desert from Alexandria, Egypt, to capture the Tripolitan city of Derna. This was the first time the United States flag was raised in victory on foreign soil. The action is memorialized in a line of the Marines' Hymn—"the shores of Tripoli". The capturing of the city gave American negotiators leverage in securing the return of hostages and the end of the war.

Peace treaty and legacy
Wearied of the blockade and raids, and now under threat of a continued advance on Tripoli proper and a scheme to restore his deposed older brother Hamet Karamanli as ruler, Yusuf Karamanli signed a treaty ending hostilities on 10 June 1805. Article 2 of the treaty reads:
The Bashaw of Tripoli shall deliver up to the American squadron now off Tripoli, all the Americans in his possession; and all the subjects of the Bashaw of Tripoli now in the power of the United States of America shall be delivered up to him; and as the number of Americans in possession of the Bashaw of Tripoli amounts to three hundred persons, more or less; and the number of Tripolino subjects in the power of the Americans to about, one hundred more or less; The Bashaw of Tripoli shall receive from the United States of America, the sum of sixty thousand dollars, as a payment for the difference between the prisoners herein mentioned.

In agreeing to pay a ransom of $60,000 for the American prisoners, the Jefferson administration drew a distinction between paying tribute and paying ransom. At the time, some argued that buying sailors out of slavery was a fair exchange to end the war. William Eaton, however, remained bitter for the rest of his life about the treaty, feeling that his efforts had been squandered by the American emissary from the United States Department of State, diplomat Tobias Lear. Eaton and others felt that the capture of Derna should have been used as a bargaining chip to obtain the release of all American prisoners without having to pay ransom. Furthermore, Eaton believed the honor of the United States had been compromised when it abandoned Hamet Karamanli after promising to restore him as leader of Tripoli. Eaton's complaints generally went unheard, especially as attention turned to the strained international relations which would ultimately lead to the withdrawal of the United States Navy from the area in 1807 and to the War of 1812.

The First Barbary War was beneficial to the reputation of the United States' military command and war mechanism, which had been up to that time relatively untested. The First Barbary War showed that the United States could execute a war far from home, and that American forces had the cohesion to fight together as Americans rather than separately as Georgians, New Yorkers, etc. The United States Navy and United States Marine Corps became a permanent part of the United States government and United States history, and Decatur returned to the United States as its first post-revolutionary war hero.

However, the more immediate problem of Barbary piracy was not fully settled. By 1807, Algiers had gone back to taking American ships and seamen hostage. Distracted by the preludes to the War of 1812, the United States was unable to respond to the provocation until 1815, with the Second Barbary War, in which naval victories by Commodores William Bainbridge and Stephen Decatur led to treaties ending all tribute payments by the US.

Monument

The Tripoli Monument, the oldest military monument in the United States, honors the American heroes of the First Barbary War: Master Commandant Richard Somers, Lieutenant James Caldwell, James Decatur (brother of Stephen Decatur), Henry Wadsworth, Joseph Israel and John Dorsey. Originally known as the Naval Monument, it was carved of Carrara marble in Italy in 1806 and brought to the United States on board  ("Old Ironsides"). From its original location in the Washington Navy Yard, it was moved to the west terrace of the national Capitol and finally, in 1860, to the United States Naval Academy in Annapolis, Maryland.

See also
 Barbary slave trade
 Barbary treaties
 Islamic views on slavery
 Military history of the United States
 Second Barbary War
 Slavery in the Ottoman Empire
 To the Shores of Tripoli
 Treaty of Tripoli

References

Bibliography

Further reading

External links
 Treaties with The Barbary Powers :
 Naval Documents Related to the United States War with the Barbary Powers
 
  (Heritage Lecture #940)
 First American-Barbary War

 
Ottoman Tripolitania
Presidency of Thomas Jefferson
United States Marine Corps in the 18th and 19th centuries
Wars involving Morocco
Wars involving Sweden
Wars involving the Ottoman Empire
Wars involving the United States
1800s conflicts